José Rossi (born June 18, 1944 in Ajaccio) is French politician, who served as the President of the Corsican Assembly from 1998 to 2004.

References

Living people
1944 births
French politicians